The 151st Aviation Regiment is an aviation regiment of the U.S. Army, primarily provided by the South Carolina Army National Guard.

Structure
 1st Battalion (Attack Reconnaissance) "Ghostriders" at McEntire Joint National Guard Base, Eastover
 Company A (AH-64) “Nightmare”
 Iraq 2004 - 2005
 Company B (AH-64) "Mustang"
 Iraq 2004 - 2005
 Company C (AH-64) "Checkmate"
 2nd Battalion (Security and Support)
 Company A (UH-72A)
 Detachment 1 (VA ARNG)
 Detachment ? at Army Aviation Support Facility #2, Donaldson Center Airport (SC ARNG)
 Company B (UH-72A)
 Detachment 1 (NC ARNG)
 Company C
 (-) at  Army Aviation Support Facility #1 Joint Base Berry Field (TN ARNG)"GHOSTRIDERS"'
 Detachment 1 at General Lucius D. Clay National Guard Center (GA ARNG)
 Company D
 Detachment 1 (MS ARNG),(LA ARNG)

Distinctive Unit Insignia

References

Citations

Bibliography

151